The 2019 season was the 114th season of competitive football in Norway.

The season began on 31 March 2019, and ended on 8 December with the 2019 Norwegian Football Cup final.

Men's football

League season

Promotion and relegation

Eliteserien

1. divisjon

2. divisjon

Group 1

Group 2

3. divisjon

Group 1

Group 2

Group 3

Group 4

Group 5

Group 6

4. divisjon

Cup competitions

Norwegian Cup

Final

Mesterfinalen

Women's football

League season

Promotion and relegation

Toppserien

1. divisjon

2. divisjon

Norwegian Women's Cup

Final

UEFA competitions

UEFA Champions League

Qualifying phase

First qualifying round

|}

Second qualifying round

|}

Third qualifying round

|}

Play-off round

|}

UEFA Europa League

Qualifying phase and play-off round (Main Path)

First qualifying round

|}

Second qualifying round

|}

Third qualifying round

|}

Play-off round

|}

Group stage

Group D

UEFA Women's Champions League

2018–19

Knockout phase

Quarter-finals

The tournament continued from the 2018 season.

|}

2019–20

Qualifying round

Group 8

National teams

Norway men's national football team

UEFA Euro 2020 qualifying

Group F

Norway women's national football team

Friendlies

2019 Algarve Cup

Group C

Final

2019 FIFA Women's World Cup

Group A

Knockout stage

UEFA Women's Euro 2021 qualifying

Group C

References

 
Seasons in Norwegian football